Sir Cory Francis Cory-Wright, 1st Baronet (11 August 1838 – 30 May 1909) was a British businessman.

Biography

The son of William Wright and Elizabeth Hooper, he married Mima Owen, the daughter of Sir Hugh Owen and Ann Wade, on 25 September 1867. Sir Cory Francis Cory-Wright, 1st Baronet Cory-Wright held the office of Deputy Lieutenant (DL) of Middlesex and was a Justice of the Peace (JP) for Middlesex and London.

He was the Chairman of William Cory & Son and was a County Alderman (CA) for Middlesex and High Sheriff of Middlesex in 1902.  He was created a Baronet Cory-Wright, of Caen Wood Towers, Highgate St. Pancras, co. London and Hornsey, co. Middlesex on 28 August 1903. Born Cory Wright, he assumed by Royal licence the additional surname of Cory in 1903.

He died on 30 May 1909, aged 70, and was succeeded to the title by his son Arthur Cory-Wright. He is buried on the western side of Highgate Cemetery in a family mausoleum located to the south of the Egyptian Avenue.

References

External links
Cory-Wright on thePeerage.com

1838 births
1909 deaths
Burials at Highgate Cemetery
Baronets in the Baronetage of the United Kingdom
High Sheriffs of Middlesex
Councillors in Greater London
Deputy Lieutenants of Middlesex
Members of Middlesex County Council
19th-century British businesspeople